The KSGV is a Dutch association that organizes conferences and publishes articles and books which are related to faith, religion and mental health, undertaking its activities from a Christian inspiration

The chair of the board of directors as of March 2006 is  Dr. Frans Derks.

External links
Official sites
 Main Web site (Dutch)
KSGV English Summary

References

Religious organisations based in the Netherlands